Grant City may refer to:

Grant City, Indiana
Grant City, Missouri
Grant City, Staten Island, New York
 Grant City (Staten Island Railway station)
Grant City, the discount department store division of American retail chain W.T. Grant